Tell Saadiya (also Tell es-Saadiya) is a tell, or archaeological settlement mound, in Diyala Governorate (Iraq).

Archaeological research 
Excavations at the site were conducted in 1979–1980. They were part of an international salvage operation organized by the Iraqi Directorate of Antiquities which aimed to protect historical monuments in the Gebel Hamrin region endangered by the building of a dam on the Diyala River (Hamrin program, Hamrin Dam Salvage Project). Archaeological works at Tell Saadiya were carried out by a team from the Polish Centre of Mediterranean Archaeology University of Warsaw, headed by Stefan K. Kozłowski and Piotr Bieliński. The northern and western slopes of the small tell (about 80 m in diameter) had already been destroyed by construction works. Most of the site was occupied by a modern cemetery, which had disturbed the stratigraphy. The excavations uncovered a settlement from the Ubaid period (5th millennium BC) with multi-room houses built of sun-dried mud-bricks, as well as pottery kilns. Some of the houses were more impressive, featuring a central hall with rooms, usually smaller, adjacent to its longer sides. Child burials in urns were found under some of the floors. These burial containers, including beautifully-painted jugs, were the most valuable objects discovered at the site.

See also 

 Tell Rashid
 Tell Abada
Tell Madhur

References

Further reading 
 Polish National Commission for UNESCO Review. 2017/18 bulletin (Polish Archaeology for the Safeguarding  of World Heritage)
 A. Pieńkowska, D. Szeląg, I. Zych (Eds). Stories Told Around the Fountain. Papers Offered to Piotr Bieliński on the Occasion of His 70th Birthday, Warsaw: PCMA, University of Warsaw Press 2019
 Kozłowski, S. K., Bieliński, P. Tell el-Saadiya; A preliminary report on the first season of excavations, 1979. Sumer, 40 (1985).

External links 
 Salvage excavations at Tell Saadiya

Saadiya
Diyala Governorate
Ubaid period
Saadiya